Traditionalist Catholicism is the set of beliefs, practices, customs, traditions, liturgical forms, devotions, and presentations of Catholic teaching that existed in the Catholic Church before the reforms of the Second Vatican Council (1962–1965), in particular attachment to the Tridentine Mass, also known as the Traditional Latin Mass.

Traditionalist Catholics were disturbed by the liturgical changes that followed the Second Vatican Council, which some feel stripped the liturgy of its outward sacredness, eroding faith in the real presence of Christ in the Eucharist. Many also see the teaching on ecumenism as blurring the distinction between Catholicism and other Christians. Traditional Catholics generally promote a modest style of dressing and teach a complementarian view of gender roles.

History
Towards the end of the Second Vatican Council, Father Gommar DePauw came into conflict with Cardinal Lawrence Shehan, Archbishop of Baltimore, over the interpretation of the council's teachings, particularly about liturgical matters. In January 1965, DePauw incorporated an organization called the Catholic Traditionalist Movement in New York State, purportedly with the support of Cardinal Francis Spellman, Archbishop of New York.

By the late 1960s and early 1970s, conservative Catholics opposed to or uncomfortable with the social and liturgical changes brought about by the Second Vatican Council began to coalesce. In 1973, the Orthodox Roman Catholic Movement (ORCM) was founded by two priests, Francis E. Fenton and Robert McKenna, that set up chapels in many parts of North America for the preservation of the Tridentine Mass. Those priests that participated in this were listed as being on a leave of absence by their bishops, who disapproved of their actions. In 1970, French Archbishop Marcel Lefebvre founded the Society of Saint Pius X (SSPX), made up of priests who would say only the Traditional Latin Mass and who stood opposed to what he saw as excessive liberal influences in the Church. Over time, Lefebvre's movement grew despite split-offs by various offshoot groups, such as the Istituto Mater Boni Consilii (IMBC), a sedeprivationist religious congregation of clergy who were dissatisfied with the SSPX position of acknowledging John Paul II as an authentic pope but disobeying him. Sedeprivationists hold that the current occupant of the papal office is a duly-elected pope, but he lacks the authority and ability to teach or to govern unless he recants the changes brought by the Second Vatican Council. 

Some Catholics, many never affiliated with Lefebvre, took the position of sedevacantism, which teaches Pope John XXIII and his successors are heretics and cannot therefore be considered popes, and that the new Church and new expressions of the sacraments are not valid. Other, marginal groups known as conclavists have elected their own popes in opposition to the men generally considered by the world to be the true popes. The Society of Saint Pius V (SSPV) broke off from Lefebvre over its objections to the SSPX's use of the missal of Pope John XXIII, preferring instead the missal in use before the post-1955 liturgical reforms of Pope Pius XII, and publicly questioning the legitimacy of the post-Vatican II popes. Lefebvre officially denounced these positions, but his movement still drew the suspicion of Roman authorities. In 1988, he and another bishop consecrated four men as bishops without papal permission, resulting in excommunication Latae sententiae for all six men directly involved, not of the Society.

Some members of the SSPX, unwilling to participate in what they considered schism, left and founded the Priestly Fraternity of Saint Peter (FSSP), which celebrates the Traditional Latin Mass but in full communion with the Holy See. During the papacy of Pope Benedict XVI, numerous attempts were made to bring the SSPX back from its separation from the authority of the Church, including the lifting of the excommunications on the four surviving bishops by Pope Benedict XVI in 2009. These efforts failed, but the efforts of the SSPX to negotiate with Rome led to the establishment of the minority SSPX Resistance.

Different types

Traditionalist Catholics may be divided into four broad groups.

In good standing with the Holy See
Since the Second Vatican Council, several traditionalist organizations have been started with or have subsequently obtained approval from the Catholic Church. These organizations accept in principle the documents of the Second Vatican Council, and regard the changes associated with the Council (such as the revision of the Mass) as legitimate, if often prudentially unwise, but celebrate the older forms with the approval of the Holy See.
 Priestly Fraternity of St Peter (FSSP)
 Institute of Christ the King Sovereign Priest (ICRSS, ICKSP)
 Sons of the Most Holy Redeemer (FSSR)
 Institute of the Good Shepherd (IBP)
 Servants of Jesus and Mary (Servi Jesu et Mariae, SJM)
 Canons Regular of the New Jerusalem (CRNJ)
 Canons Regular of Saint John Cantius (SJC)
 Canons Regular of Saint Thomas Aquinas
 Canons Regular of the Holy Cross
 Fraternity of Saint Vincent Ferrer
 Personal Apostolic Administration of Saint John Mary Vianney (PAASJV)
 Miles Christi (MC)
 Missionaries of Saint John the Baptist (MSJB)

There are also multiple monastic communities, including
 Monastery of Our Lady of the Annunciation of Clear Creek
 Monastery of St. Benedict in Norcia
 Monks of the Most Blessed Virgin Mary of Mount Carmel
 Monastery of Our Lady of the Cenacle
 Le Barroux Abbey

See Communities using the Tridentine Mass for a more detailed list.

In addition, many traditionalist Catholics in good standing with Rome are served by local diocesan or religious priests who are willing and able to offer the traditional rites. Many other Catholics who sympathize with or who identify themselves as traditionalist are not able to attend the traditional liturgy regularly because it is not offered in their area (at least not with regular canonical standing) and attend the Mass of Paul VI, the current ordinary or normal Roman Rite of Mass following the Second Vatican Council.  Others may attend the liturgies of Eastern Catholic Churches, if they are available. There are also numerous local and international lay organizations of traditionalist Catholics, such as the youth-groups of Juventutem.

Communities viewed by the Holy See as having irregular status
Some traditionalists receive the Sacraments from priests that are suspended a divinis by the Catholic Church, though these priests and the Catholics that attend them affirm their loyalty to the Catholic Church, while at the same time affirming that teachings of the Second Vatican Council on ecumenism, religious liberty, and collegiality are inconsistent with Catholic teaching and doctrine. They form what Julie Byrne terms the right wing of independent Catholicism: "Independents vary widely, ranging from right to left in the political spectrum. On the right traditionalist churches practice versions of Catholicism more conservative than Rome.  

The largest priestly society to fit this description is the Society of Saint Pius X (SSPX), which was founded in 1970, with the authorisation of the bishop of Lausanne, Geneva and Fribourg, by Archbishop Marcel Lefebvre. Members of this category view many of the post-Conciliar changes as doctrinally and pastorally unacceptable. They recognise the official Church hierarchy, while generally functioning independently of them and rejecting some decisions which they perceive as inconsistent with the Catholic faith, or ineffective in terms of catechesis and how the Catholic faith is passed down. This way of acting draws accusations of disloyalty and disobedience from many, including from members of the preceding groups that are recognised by the Holy See; on the other hand, the SSPX and groups like them consider their accusers guilty of blind obedience, which is not imposed by—and can be contrary to—the requirements of Catholic faith and morals. Discussions between the SSPX and the Holy See have been in progress for some years. In January 2009 the Prefect of the Congregation for Bishops remitted the excommunications which the Congregation had declared to have been incurred by the Society's bishops in 1988. Bishop Bernard Fellay of the Society expressed his gratitude for this act, though the Society has always held that the excommunications never took effect in the first place (citing canon 1323, §4, canon 1323, 7 and canon 1324, §3; §1, 8 of the 1983 Code of Canon Law). The Prefect of the Congregation for Bishops further expressed the hope that the Society would speedily return to "full communion" with the Church by showing "true fidelity and true acknowledgment of the Magisterium and the authority of the pope". 

The SSPX rejects the notion of "full" and "partial" communion with the Church, insisting that they belong to the Church according to the criteria given by Pope Pius XII, because they have the same faith, celebrate the same Sacraments, and recognise the same hierarchy of the Church. More recently, the Vatican has granted priests of the SSPX the authority to hear confessions and has authorised local ordinaries, in certain circumstances, to grant delegation to SSPX priests to act as the qualified witness required for valid celebration of marriage. In each of these documents the hope was expressed that thereby "the process towards full institutional regularisation may be facilitated".

Sedeprivationists

Sedeprivationists hold that the current occupant of the papal office is a duly-elected pope, but he lacks the authority and ability to teach or to govern unless he recants the changes brought by the Second Vatican Council. Sedeprivationists teach that the popes from Pope John XXIII onward fall into this category.

Traditionalist Catholic groups that espouse sedeprivationism include the Istituto Mater Boni Consilii, as well as the Orthodox Roman Catholic Movement among others.

Sedevacantists

Sedevacantists hold that the Vatican II popes have forfeited their position through their acceptance of heretical teachings connected with the Second Vatican Council and consequently there is at present no known true pope. They conclude, on the basis of their rejection of the revised Mass rite and their rejection of certain aspects of postconciliar Church teaching as false, that the popes involved are also false. This is a minority position among traditionalist Catholics and a highly divisive one, so that many who hold it prefer to say nothing of their view, while other sedevacantists have accepted episcopal ordination from sources such as Archbishop Pierre Martin Ngô Đình Thục.

The terms sedevacantist and sedevacantism derive from the Latin phrase sede vacante ("while the chair/see [of Saint Peter] is vacant"), a term normally applied to the period between the death or resignation of one pope and the election of his successor.

The best-known, and likely best-organized Sedevacantist organization is the Congregation of Mary Immaculate Queen (CMRI). Many often refer to the Society of Saint Pius V (SSPV) as being a Sedevacantist organization as well; however, it has never formally adopted this position and considers the question of the validity of recent Papacies to be unresolved.

Conclavists

Conclavism is the belief and practice of some who, claiming that all recent occupants of the papal see are not true popes, elect someone else and propose him as the true pope to whom the allegiance of Catholics is due. They are often classified as sedevacantists because they reject the official papal succession for the same reasons. Conclavist groups include the

 "True Catholic Church", founded by Lucian Pulvermacher ("Pope Pius XIII")
 Palmarian Catholic Church, founded by Clemente Domínguez y Gómez ("Pope Gregory XVII")
 Pope Michael

Positions

Traditionalist Catholics believe that they are preserving Catholic orthodoxy by not accepting all changes introduced since the Second Vatican Council, changes that some of them have described as amounting to a "veritable revolution". They claim that the positions now taken by mainstream Catholics—even conservative Catholics—would have been considered "modernist" or "liberal" at the time of the Council, and that they themselves hold positions that were then considered "conservative" or "traditional".

Many traditionalists further believe that errors have crept into the presentation and understanding of Catholic teachings since the time of the Council. They attribute the blame for this to liberal interpretations of the documents produced by the Second Vatican Council, to harmful post-conciliar pastoral decisions, to the text of the conciliar documents themselves, or to some combination of these.

Most traditionalists view the Council as a valid, albeit problematic, Ecumenical Council of the Catholic Church, though most sedevacantists regard it as wholly invalid. It is common for traditionalists in dispute with Rome to affirm that the Council was "pastoral", and hence that its decrees were not absolutely binding on Catholics in the same way as the dogmatic decrees of other Ecumenical Councils. Support for this view is sought in Pope John XXIII's Opening Address to the Council, Pope Paul VI's closing address, statements from Pope Benedict XVI, and the lack of formal dogmatic definitions in the Conciliar documents.

Pope Benedict XVI contrasted the "hermeneutic of discontinuity and rupture" that some apply to the Council (an interpretation adopted both by certain traditionalists and by certain "progressives") with the "hermeneutic of reform, as it was presented first by Pope John XXIII in his Speech inaugurating the Council on 11 October 1962 and later by Pope Paul VI in his Discourse for the Council's conclusion on 7 December 1965." He made a similar point in a speech to the bishops of Chile in 1988, when he was still Cardinal Joseph Ratzinger:
[Archbishop Lefebvre] declared that he has finally understood that the agreement he signed aimed only at integrating his foundation into the 'Conciliar Church'. The Catholic Church in union with the Pope is, according to him, the 'Conciliar Church' which has broken with its own past. It seems indeed that he is no longer able to see that we are dealing with the Catholic Church in the totality of its Tradition, and that Vatican II belongs to that.

Responding to a comment that some consider tradition in a rigid way, Pope Francis remarked in 2016 that "there’s a traditionalism that is a rigid fundamentalism; this is not good. Fidelity on the other hand implies growth. In transmitting the deposit of faith from one epoch to another, tradition grows and consolidates itself with the passing of time, as St Vincent of Lérins said [...] 'The dogma of the Christian religion too must follow these laws. It progresses, consolidates itself with the years, developing itself with time, deepening itself with age'.”

There is some tension between different traditionalist groups at the official level: the SSPX, for example, condemns the FSSP and attendance at its Masses and is also often in conflict with other traditionalists. In fact, the common denominator that is held by all the groups identifying as traditionalist is love of the traditional form of the Mass and the other sacraments, traditional devotions, a handful of teachings that they claim have become obscured since the Second Vatican Council, and, usually, suspicion of modern "neoconservative" Catholicism, which is viewed as shallow, ahistorical, and intellectually dishonest. On other questions, there are a variety of opinions.

Many traditionalist Catholics associate themselves with a particular priestly society. Other small groups of traditionalists sometimes form around an individual "independent" priest who has no ties with any particular organisation.

Some leaders of Independent Catholic Churches also claim to be traditionalist Catholics and to be preserving the Tridentine Mass and ancient traditions. Examples are the Canonical Old Roman Catholic Church, and the Fraternité Notre-Dame.

Traditionalists' statements of discontinuity and rupture

Traditionalists' claims that substantive changes have taken place in Catholic teaching and practice since the Council often crystallise around the following specific alleged examples, in which others see not what Pope Benedict XVI called "discontinuity and rupture", but what he called "renewal in the continuity of the one subject-Church which the Lord has given to us":
 A new ecclesiology which they claim fails to recognise the Catholic Church as the one true church established by Jesus Christ, and instead holds that the Roman Catholic Church is some sub-set of the Church founded by Christ. They see some of the confusion as stemming from an unclear understanding of the phrase "subsists in" which appears in the Vatican II document Lumen gentium, and which the Church has declared applies uniquely to the Catholic Church and means the "perduring, historical continuity and permanence of all the elements instituted by Christ in the Catholic Church, in which the Church of Christ is concretely found on this earth". They claim that this "new ecclesiology" contradicts Pope Pius XII's Mystici corporis Christi and other papal documents.
 A new ecumenism which they see as aiming at a false pan-Christian religious unity which does not require non-Catholics to convert to the Catholic faith. They see this as contradicting the teachings of the Bible, Pope Pius XI's Mortalium animos, Pope Pius XII's Humani generis and other documents. See also Traditionalist criticism of ecumenism and criticism of doctrine on relations with non-Christians.
 In this connection, some traditionalist Catholics called it a blasphemy on the part of Pope Francis when, in 2017, the Philatelic Office of Vatican City State, to commemorate the 500th anniversary of the Protestant Reformation issued a postage stamp showing Martin Luther and Philip Melanchthon kneeling with a penitential disposition on either side of the cross.
 Acceptance of the principle of religious liberty as involving more than prudent religious tolerance, based on one interpretation of the Second Vatican Council's decree Dignitatis Humanae, allegedly in contradiction to Pope Pius IX's teachings in Quanta cura and the Syllabus of Errors.
 A revision of the Mass liturgy of the Roman rite which, they affirm, de-emphasises the central Catholic doctrines that the Mass is a true sacrifice and that the bread and wine are changed through transubstantiation into the body and blood of Jesus Christ, that it has been stripped of important prayers, that it is centered on the congregation rather than on God, that it is less beautiful and spiritually edifying, and that it omits certain Bible readings that mention subjects such as hell, miracles, and sin. Traditionalists hold differing opinions on the validity and acceptability of the revised rite of Mass:
 Some see it as valid, and as acceptable when necessary, though the older form should be attended when possible.
 Some, including the leadership of the Society of St Pius X, hold that it is in principle valid as a sacramental rite but maintain that the revisions in the liturgy are displeasing to God, and that it is often celebrated improperly to the extent of being sacramentally invalid. They therefore generally refuse to attend it.
 Some, including many sedevacantists, see it as categorically invalid in principle and entirely unacceptable.
 Some hold that celebration of any modern-language translation even of the Tridentine Mass would have to be presumed invalid.
 An inappropriate emphasis on the "dignity of man", which they claim ignores original sin and the need for supernatural grace, and which they also claim has led to a utopianism that sees world peace as possible without recognising the kingship of Christ. They see this orientation as contradicting Pope Pius XI's Quas primas, Pope Leo XIII's Rerum novarum, and other papal and conciliar documents.
 A teaching on collegiality that attributes to the bishops of the world a share, with the Pope, of responsibility for the Church's governance in a way that they claim is destructive of papal authority and encourages a "national" church mentality that undermines the primacy of the Holy See.  They also claim that national bishops' conferences, whose influence was greatly increased following the Council, "diminish the personal responsibility of bishop[s]" within their dioceses.
 A new and critical attitude towards the Bible that, they say, contradicts Leo XIII's Providentissimus Deus and Benedict XV's Spiritus Paraclitus, among other documents.
 A departure from the traditional belief that the Church and the world are at variance with one another to some degree, and that the Church has enemies. They believe that Pope Pius X's warnings in Pascendi Dominici gregis, Leo XIII's Humanum genus and other papal warnings against Freemasonry and other alleged enemies of Christianity have gone unheeded.

Example of one such claimant 
Georges de Nantes, a priest of the Diocese of Grenoble and founder of the traditionalist Catholic League for Catholic Counter-Reformation, criticized the Second Vatican Council for encouraging ecumenism and reform of the Church, and accused Pope Paul VI of heresy and of turning the Church into a movement for advancing democracy, a system of government that de Nantes abhorred. The Congregation for the Doctrine of the Faith issued a notification on 10 August 1969, stating that, as de Nantes continued to maintain his views on the Council, the aggiornamento of the Church, the French episcopate, and the "heresies" of Pope Paul VI, he thereby "disqualified the entirety of his writings and his activities". It issued another notification in 1983, published on L'Osservatore Romano of 16–17 May of that year, stating that de Nantes had come to Rome to present a "Book of Accusation against Pope John Paul II for Heresy, Schism and Scandal", and that the Secretary of the Congregation had received him, as instructed by the Pope, but had refused to accept from him a book that contained unjustified gravely offensive accusations of the same character as those that de Nantes had directed against Pope Paul VI in a book published in 1973. It added that the refusal of de Nantes to retract his previous attacks on Pope Paul VI and the Second Vatican Council, to which he was now adding attacks on Pope John Paul II, made it impossible to believe in the sincerity of his declaration in 1978 and 1981 of a desire for the reconciliation for which the Pope remained always disposed.

Responses to traditionalists' statements
Those who in response to these criticisms by certain traditionalists defend the decisions of the Second Vatican Council and the subsequent changes made by the Holy See make the following counterclaims:
 They say that the criticisms are false, exaggerated, or lacking appreciation of the organic character of Tradition, and give as examples traditionalist criticisms that Dignitatis humanae contradicts the Church's earlier teaching on religious liberty, and that the revised rite of Mass represents a break rather than a prudent development of the earlier liturgy.
 They say that traditionalists who claim that there has been a break from and discontinuity with the Church's traditional teaching are displaying a Protestant attitude of "private judgement" on matters of doctrine, instead of accepting the guidance of the Magisterium of the Church.
 They say that such traditionalists fail to distinguish properly between changeable pastoral practices (such as the liturgy of the Mass) and the unchangeable principles of the Catholic faith (such as the dogmas surrounding the Mass).
 They say that traditionalists of this kind treat papal authority in much the same way as the dissident, liberal Catholics. While liberals believe that, on sexual matters, "the Pope can teach whatever he wants... but whether or not he should be listened to is very much an open question", the stance of certain traditionalists on the reform of the Mass liturgy and contemporary teachings on ecumenism and religious liberty amounts to the view that, on these issues, "faithful Catholics are always free to resist [the Pope's] folly.... As theories of religious dissent go, Catholic liberals couldn't ask for anything more."
 The traditionalist claim that the Second Vatican Council was pastoral (and not infallible) is often countered by referring to Paul VI subsequently emphasizing the authoritative nature of the Council's teachings.

Reception
Integrism is traditionalist Catholicism that integrates social and political contexts. Kay Chadwick writes: "It would be naive to suppose that [Catholic integrism] does not harbour a political agenda. It is anti-Masonic, anti-liberal and anti-Communist. It finds a voice in the Right-wing press. ... The annual Joan of Arc procession in Paris brings together integrists and National Front supporters. The annual National Front party celebration is preceded by a Latin Mass, celebrated in the pre-1970 form. Just before his death in March 1988, Lefebvre was fined eight thousand francs by the Court of Appeal in Paris for 'racial defamation' and 'incitement to racial hatred', for publicly suggesting that immigrants, beginning with Muslims, should be expelled from Europe. In 1976, he declared his support for Latin American dictatorships. He was an admirer of Maurras and Pétain, and supported the cause of French Algeria."

The Southern Poverty Law Center (SPLC) used the term radical traditionalist Catholics to refer to those who "may make up the largest single group of serious anti-Semites in America, subscribe to an ideology that is rejected by the Vatican and some 70 million mainstream American Catholics. Many of their leaders have been condemned and even excommunicated by the official church." The SPLC claims that adherents of radical traditional Catholicism "routinely pillory Jews as 'the perpetual enemy of Christ'", reject the ecumenical efforts of the Vatican, and sometimes assert that all recent Popes are illegitimate. The SPLC says that adherents are "incensed by the liberalizing reforms" of the Second Vatican Council (1962–65) which condemned hatred for Jewish people and "rejected the accusation that Jews are collectively responsible for deicide in the form of the crucifixion of Christ" and that "Radical traditional Catholics" also embrace "extremely conservative social ideals with respect to women."

The SPLC clarifies, however, "Radical traditionalists are not the same as Catholics who call themselves 'traditionalists' — people who prefer the old Latin Mass to the mass now typically said in vernacular languages — although the radicals, as well, like their liturgy in Latin."

Practices

Rite of Mass

The best-known and most visible sign of Catholic traditionalism is an attachment to the form that the Roman Rite liturgy of the Mass had before the liturgical reform of 1969–1970, in the various editions of the Roman Missal published between 1570 and 1962. This form is generally known as the Tridentine Mass, though traditionalists usually prefer to call it the Traditional Mass. Many refer to it as the Latin Mass, though Latin is the language also of the official text of the post-Vatican II Mass, to which vernacular translations are obliged to conform, and canon law states that "the eucharistic celebration is to be carried out in the Latin language or in another language provided that the liturgical texts have been legitimately approved." In his 2007 motu proprio Summorum Pontificum Pope Benedict XVI relaxed the regulations on use of the 1962 Missal, designating it "an" extraordinary form of the Roman Rite, as opposed to "the" ordinary or normal form, as revised successively by Pope Paul VI and Pope John Paul II. In 2021, Pope Francis promulgated Traditionis custodes, amending and abrogating parts of Summorum Pontificum.

Different traditionalist priests use different editions of the Roman Missal to celebrate the Tridentine Mass. Most, not only those in good standing with the Holy See but also such as those in the SSPX, use the 1962 edition, the only one that the Holy See authorises. A series of modifications to the 1962 liturgy introduced in 1965 are used by some traditionalists in good standing with Rome. This version of the liturgy is sometimes referred to as that of the "1965 Missal", though no new edition of the Roman Missal was in fact published in that year. The Priestly Fraternity of St. Peter, in an effort to get around the 1955 Holy Week reforms of Pius XII, which are part of the 1962 edition, has requested special permission from the Pontifical Commission Ecclesia Dei for provisional use of the older Holy Week rites "ad experimentum," beginning in 2018 and running through Holy Week 2020, at which point it will be determined whether the Holy See will grant a broader permission.

Since sedevacantists consider John XXIII not to have been a Pope, they reject the 1962 typical edition of the Roman Missal, which he promulgated. They generally use the 1920 typical edition, updated to some date previous to 1962. The Congregation of Mary Immaculate Queen follows the Missal as in 1955, accepting the changes introduced by Pius XII, but others reject his alteration of the calendar of saints and his revision of the rites of Holy Week. Thus these others reject John XXIII's 1962 edition, which most notably featured the addition of St. Joseph to the enumeration of saints in the Roman Canon, and Pius XII's changes, seeing these changes as steps that led to the post-Vatican II Mass. There are no reports of priests regularly using any typical edition of the Missal earlier than that of 1920, which incorporated the rubrical and calendar changes made by Pope Pius X in 1910.

Linked with the celebration of the Tridentine Mass is the observance of the liturgical calendar of saints' days as it existed before the revision of 1969 (see General Roman Calendar of 1960). Some also ignore the revisions of 1960 by Pope John XXIII, and of 1955 by Pope Pius XII, and use instead the General Roman Calendar of 1954.

Individual and private devotions
Many traditionalist Catholics lay stress on following customs prevailing immediately before the Second Vatican Council, such as the following:
 Abstaining from meat on Fridays. Present discipline maintains Fridays and Lent as days and times of penance, declares that abstinence from meat or some other food as determined by the local episcopal conference is to be observed on all Fridays (excluding solemnities) and on Ash Wednesday, and allows episcopal conferences to permit other practices of personal penance to take the place of abstinence from meat.
 Fasting from Midnight until the reception of Holy Communion. The traditional Catholic rule of fasting from midnight until the reception of Holy Communion (this Eucharistic Fast is from both food and liquids), which is required by the 1917 Code of Canon Law, was shortened in 1953 by Pope Pius XII to a 3-hour fast. In 1966,  Pope Paul VI reduced the fast further to one hour, a rule included in the 1983 Code of Canon Law. Many traditional Catholics will thus fast from midnight until they receive Holy Communion at Mass, while others will keep a Eucharistic Fast for at least three hours.
 Kneeling to receive Communion directly upon the tongue, under the Host species alone, and from the hand of a cleric rather than a layperson. Some would refuse to receive even from deacons, who, before the reforms of Pope Paul VI, were allowed to give Holy Communion only if there were a serious reason for permitting them to do so. Many traditionalists regard the practice of receiving communion in the hand, though ancient  and authorised by the Holy See, as an abuse and as sacrilegious.
 Women wearing a headcovering when praying at home and when worshipping inside a church, as St. Paul required in 1 Corinthians 11:1-17 and which the 1917 Code of Canon Law required. Accordingly, many traditionalist Catholic women wear a veil, a hat, or a headscarf when praying at home and when worshipping inside a church.
 Frequent confession, a practice that grew in the first half of the 20th century, when increasingly frequent Communion led to more frequent confession.
 Prayers such as the Stations of the Cross and the Rosary in the form in use in the mid-20th century, and so without the alterations in the number and identity of the Stations that became common, though by no means universal, in the time of Pope Paul VI and without the addition of the Luminous Mysteries of the Rosary given as an option by Pope John Paul II.

These practices are not confined to traditionalists: many mainstream Catholics also follow them.  Likewise, they are not all followed by all traditionalist Catholics at all times.

Clothing and lifestyle
Traditional Catholics, with respect to male and female gender roles, adhere to the doctrine of complementarianism.

The standards of clothing among Traditional Catholics, based on instructions given by Pope Pius XI and consequently promoted by the Purity Crusade of Mary Immaculate, is referred to as "Mary-like Modesty", which includes for women, wearing sleeves "extending at least to the elbows" and "skirts reaching below the knees", as well as having a neckline no more than two inches with the rest of the bodice fully covered. 

Richard Williamson, then a bishop of the Society of Saint Pius X, stated that "women's trousers, as worn today, short or long, modest or immodest, tight or loose, open or disguised (like the "culottes”), are an assault upon woman's womanhood and so they represent a deep-lying revolt against the order willed by God." 

It is commonplace for women who identify as traditionalist Catholics to wear a head covering (veil) while praying at home and attending celebrations of the Mass.

The Society of Saint Pius X (SSPX) opposes the presence of television in the household, teaching that it is an occasion of sin.

In the Ukrainian Greek Catholic Church
Since the Second Vatican Council, various Eastern Catholic Churches have removed some practices and emphases that were derived from those of the Latin Church. Opposition to this has been given relatively high publicity with regard to the Ukrainian Greek Catholic Church (UGCC).

Background 
Even before the Second Vatican Council the Holy See declared it important to guard and preserve whole and entire forever the customs and distinct forms for administering the sacraments in use in the Eastern Catholic Churches (Pope Leo XIII, encyclical Orientalium Dignitas). Leo's successor Pope Pius X said that the priests of the newly created Russian Catholic Church should offer the Divine Liturgy Nec Plus, Nec Minus, Nec Aliter ("No more, No Less, No Different") than priests of the Russian Orthodox Church and the Old Believers.

In the Ukrainian Greek Catholic Church, liturgical de-latinization began with the 1930s corrections of the liturgical books by Metropolitan Andrey Sheptytsky. According to his biographer Cyril Korolevsky, Metropolitan Andrey opposed use of coercion against those who remained attached to Latin liturgical practices, fearing that any attempt to do so would lead to a Greek-Catholic equivalent of the 1666 Schism within the Russian Orthodox Church.

De-latinization in the UGCC gained further momentum with the 1964 decree Orientalium Ecclesiarum of the Second Vatican Council) and several subsequent documents. Latinisations were discarded within the Ukrainian diaspora, while among Byzantine Catholics in Western Ukraine, forced into a clandestine existence following the Soviet ban on the UGCC, the latinizations remained, "an important component of their underground practices", in illegal parishes, seminaries, and religious communities. After proscription of the UGCC was lifted in 1989, priests and hierarchs arrived from the diaspora and began to enforce a liturgical conformity that met with opposition.

In response, many priests, nuns, and candidates for the priesthood found themselves, "forced towards the periphery of the church since 1989 because of their wish to 'keep the tradition'." In some eparchies, particularly those of Ivano-Frankivsk and Ternopil-Zboriv, the bishops would immediately suspend any priest who, "displayed his inclination toward 'traditionalist' practices".

Vlad Naumescu reports that an article in the February 2003 issue of Patriayarkhat, the official journal of the Ukrainian Greek-Catholic Church, written by a student of the Ukrainian Catholic University, which since its 1994 foundation has been, "the strongest progressive voice within the Church". The article named priests and parishes in every eparchy in Ukraine as being involved in "a well-organized movement" and who described themselves as "traditionalists". According to the article, they constituted "a parallel structure" with connections with the Society of St. Pius X and with a charismatic leader in Fr. Basil Kovpak, the Pastor of St. Peter and Paul's Church in the suburb of Lviv-Riasne.

According to Vlad Naumescu, "Religious life in a traditionalist parish followed the model of the 'underground church.' Devotions were more intense, with each priest promoting his parish as a 'place of pilgrimage' for the neighboring areas, thus drawing larger crowds on Sunday than his local parish could provide. On Sundays and feast days, religious services took place three times a day (in Riasne), and the Sunday liturgy lasted for two and a half to three hours. The main religious celebrations took place outside the church in the middle of the neighborhood, and on every occasion traditionalists organized long processions through the entire locality. The community was strongly united by its common opponent, re-enacting the model of the 'defender of faith' common to times of repression. This model, which presupposes clear-cut attitudes and a firm moral stance, mobilized the community and reproduced the former determination of the 'underground' believers."

Priestly Society of Saint Josaphat 
The Priestly Society of Saint Josaphat (SSJK), which operates a seminary, Basilian convent, and numerous parishes, receives priestly orders from the bishops of the SSPX. Its superior, Father Basil Kovpak, has accused the UGCC hierarchy of using intense psychological pressure against priests who are reluctant or unwilling to de-Latinise. He alleges that numerous laity, attached to the Latinisations since the Soviet persecution of the UGCC, would prefer to stay home on Sunday rather than attend a de-Latinised liturgy.

The SSJK opposes removal of the stations of the cross, the rosary and the monstrance from the liturgy and parishes of the Ukrainian Greek Catholic Church. They also reject replacement of the UGCC's liturgical language, Old Church Slavonic, with the vernacular Ukrainian language. In his memoir Persecuted Tradition, Kovpak also mentions many examples of the UGCC turning away Orthodox clergy and laity who wish to convert to Eastern Catholicism. In many cases, he alleges, this is because the converts are not ethnically Ukrainian. Fr. Kovpak called this a betrayal of the efforts by Pope Pius X, Metropolitan Andrey Sheptytsky, and Exarch Leonid Feodorov to create the Russian Greek Catholic Church and to convert the Russian people.

In 2004, the year after the  publication of Fr. Kovpak's book, Cardinal Lubomyr excommunicated Kovpak from the Ukrainian Greek Catholic Church. Kovpak appealed this punishment at the papal Sacra Rota Romana in Vatican City and the excommunication was declared null and void for lack of canonical form.

In 2006, the SSJK got Latin Bishop Richard Williamson, at that time a member of the SSPX, to ordain two priests and seven deacons in Warsaw, Poland, an action that violated canons 1015 §2, 1021 and 1331 §2 of the Code of Canon Law and the corresponding canons of the Code of Canons of the Eastern Churches. 

Fr. John Jenkins, an SSPX priest who was present, later remarked, "We were all very edified by their piety, and I myself was astonished by the resemblance of the atmosphere amongst the seminarians with that which I knew in the seminary – this in spite of the difference of language, nationality and even rite."

Archeparch Ihor Vozniak of Lviv, the Archeparchy in which the PSSJ is most active, denounced the ordinations as a "criminal act", and condemned Fr. Kovpak's participation in the ceremony. He stressed that the two priests whom Bishop Williamson had ordained would not receive faculties within the Archeparchy. Officials of the Lviv archdiocese said that Kovpak could face excommunication, and that "'he deceives the church by declaring that he is a Greek (Byzantine) Catholic priest,' while supporting a group [SSPX] that uses the old Latin liturgy exclusively, eschewing the Byzantine tradition, and does not maintain allegiance to the Holy See."

Father Kovpak's excommunication process was restarted by the hierarchy of the Ukrainian Greek-Catholic Church and was confirmed by the Congregation for the Doctrine of the Faith on 23 November 2007.

Sedevacantism and Conclavism in the Ukrainian Greek Catholic Church 

In March 2008 a group of Basilian priests in Pidhirtsi, Ukraine, announced that four of them had been consecrated as bishops in order to save the Ukrainian Greek Catholic Church (UGCC) from heresy and apostasy and in August 2009, they announced the formation of the Ukrainian Orthodox Greek Catholic Church. Having elected Czech Basilian priest Fr. Anthony Elias Dohnal as "Patriarch Elijah", they declared that the Holy See was vacant, although they "elected" a new Pope, Archbishop Carlo Maria Viganò the former Apostolic Nuncio to the United States, in October 2019.  There have been allegations in both The New York Times and  the Lviv-based newspaper Ekspres that the church leadership is linked to the Russian intelligence services.

Relations with the Holy See
The Holy See recognises as fully legitimate the preference that many Catholics have for the earlier forms of worship. This was apparent in Pope John Paul II's 1988 apostolic letter Ecclesia Dei and Pope Benedict XVI's 2007 motu proprio Summorum Pontificum. Naturally, however, the Holy See does not extend its approval to those who take a stand against the present-day Church leadership, which is reiterated in Traditionis Custodes.

Ecclesia Dei Commission
The Pontifical Commission Ecclesia Dei was founded in July 1988 in the wake of Pope John Paul II's apostolic letter Ecclesia Dei. Pope Benedict XVI was a member of the Commission during his tenure as Cardinal Prefect of the Congregation for the Doctrine of the Faith.
Speaking on 16 May 2007 to the Fifth General Conference of the Bishops of Latin America and the Caribbean, Cardinal Castrillón, the current head of the Commission, stated that his department had been founded for the care of those "traditionalist Catholics" who, while discontented with the liturgical reform of the Second Vatican Council, had broken with Archbishop Marcel Lefebvre, "because they disagreed with his schismatic action in ordaining Bishops without the required papal mandate". He added that at present the Commission's activity is not limited to the service of those Catholics, nor to "the efforts undertaken to end the regrettable schismatic situation and secure the return of those brethren belonging to the Fraternity of Saint Pius X to full communion." It extends also, he said, to "satisfying the just aspirations of people, unrelated to the two aforementioned groups, who, because of their specific sensitiveness, wish to keep alive the earlier Latin liturgy in the celebration of the Eucharist and the other sacraments."

In the same speech Cardinal Castrillón indicated that it was intended to make the Commission an organ of the Holy See for the purpose of preserving and maintaining the traditional liturgy; at the same time he stated that this was not with the purpose of "going backward, of returning to the times before the 1970 reform.... The Holy Father wishes to preserve the immense spiritual, cultural and aesthetic treasure linked with the old liturgy. Recovery of these riches goes together with the no less precious riches of the Church's present liturgy." In 2019, Pope Francis suppressed this commission and transferred its responsibilities directly to the Congregation for the Doctrine of the Faith.

Summorum Pontificum
Following months of rumour and speculation, Pope Benedict XVI issued the motu proprio Summorum Pontificum in July 2007. The Pope ruled that priests of the Latin Church can freely choose between the 1962 Roman Missal and the later edition "in Masses celebrated without the people". Such celebrations may be attended by those who spontaneously ask to be allowed. Priests in charge of churches can permit stable groups of laypeople attached to the earlier form to have Mass celebrated for them in that form, provided that the celebrating priest is "qualified to [celebrate] and not juridically impeded" (this would exclude traditionalist priests not in good standing with Rome). In 2021, Pope Francis issued Traditionis custodes, which severely restricted the use of the Extraordinary Form for those not addressed by Ecclesia Dei.

The document, as well as being welcomed by the traditionalist groups that have been in good relations with Rome, has been considered by groups such as the Sons of the Most Holy Redeemer, which have been in dispute with Rome, to be sufficient grounds for seeking an agreement. The Society of Saint Pius X welcomed the document, but referred to "difficulties that still remain", including "disputed doctrinal issues" and the notice of excommunication that still affected its bishops.  Sedevacantists of course consider all documents issued by Benedict XVI to be devoid of canonical force.

Validity of holy orders

The conferring of holy orders may be valid but illicit. The Catholic Church obviously considers the orders of traditionalist clergy who are in good standing with the Holy See, such as the clergy of the Priestly Fraternity of Saint Peter or the Institute of Christ the King Sovereign Priest, to be both valid and licit. It sees as valid but illicit the orders of the bishops and priests of the Society of Saint Pius X, and accordingly considers them to be forbidden by law to exercise priestly offices, but still technically priests. As for the "independent" traditionalists, whether bishops or priests, it certainly sees their ordination as illicit, but its judgement on the validity is less clear. The Holy See declared devoid of canonical effect the consecration ceremony conducted by Archbishop Pierre Martin Ngô Đình Thục for the Carmelite Order of the Holy Face group at midnight of 31 December 1975, while expressly refraining from pronouncing on its validity. It made the same statement with regard also to any later ordinations that those bishops might confer, saying that, "as for those who have already thus unlawfully received ordination or any who may yet accept ordination from these, whatever may be the validity of the orders (quidquid sit de ordinum validitate), the Church does not and will not recognise their ordination (ipsorum ordinationem), and will consider them, for all legal effects, as still in the state in which they were before, except that the ... penalties remain until they repent."

Traditionalists themselves are divided on the question of the validity of the orders conferred using the rite promulgated by Pope Paul VI in 1968. Those who deny or put in doubt the validity of the sacramental liturgies as revised after the Second Vatican Council pass the same negative judgement on all such ordinations. The Society of Saint Pius V split from that of Saint Pius X for reasons that included Archbishop Lefebvre's acceptance of priests ordained according to the revised sacramental rites as members of the traditionalist Society that he founded.

Demographics

Estimates of the number of traditionalist Catholics vary. Catholic World News reported that "the Vatican" estimated the number of those served by the Fraternity of St Peter, the Society of St Pius X and similar groups at "close to 1 million". Various sources estimate the adherents of the Society of St Pius X alone at 1 million. No major religious survey has ever made an attempt to sample and enumerate subsets of Catholics by their position on a liberal to mainstream conservative to traditionalist and sedevacantist continuum, so any figures on the numbers of traditionalist Catholics must by necessity be more or less educated guesses.

The SSPX had priests resident in 37 countries and priests on mission in 35 more in 2018. The next largest, the FSSP, served 129 dioceses in the previous year and were in charge of 40 personal parishes. A large share of their members in each case are stationed in France. Two smaller societies, the SSPV and CMRI, are based in the United States.

List of groups
This is a list of notable traditionalist Catholic groups. Some are in full communion with the Holy See, and some have irregular status, according to doctrines and disciplines of the Catholic Church.

Canonically regular traditionalist groups
 Canons Regular of Saint John Cantius
 Canons Regular of the New Jerusalem
 Foederatio Internationalis Una Voce
 Fœderatio Internationalis Juventutem
 Fraternity of Saint Vincent Ferrer
 Heralds of the Gospel
 Institute of Christ the King Sovereign Priest (ICRSS, ICKSP)
 Institute of the Good Shepherd
 Latin Mass Society of England and Wales
 Militia Templi; The Poor Knights of Christ also called the Order of the Poor Knights of Christ, a lay order formed on 21 September 1979 with headquarters at the Castello della Magione, Poggibonsi, Italy
 Personal Apostolic Administration of Saint John Mary Vianney
 Priestly Fraternity of St. Peter (FSSP)
 Servants of the Holy Family (Servi Sanctae Familiae, SSF)
 Slaves of the Immaculate Heart of Mary (Still River, MA group only)
 Sons of the Most Holy Redeemer

Canonically irregular traditionalist groups

 Society of Saint Pius X (SSPX)
 Fraternite Notre Dame
 Priestly Society of Saint Josaphat

Sedevacantist groups
 Congregation of Mary Immaculate Queen (Congregatio Mariae Reginae Immaculatae, CMRI)

 Society of Saint Pius V

Sedeprivationist groups
 Istituto Mater Boni Consilii
 Orthodox Roman Catholic Movement

Conclavist groups
 Palmarian Christian Church
 Ukrainian Orthodox Greek Catholic Church

See also

Doctrinal and liturgical issues
 Cafeteria Catholicism
 Counter-Reformation
 Extra Ecclesiam nulla salus
 Feeneyism
 Second Vatican Council
 Mass of Paul VI
 Sedevacantism
 Tridentine Mass
 Catholic fundamentalism

Comparable phenomena in other churches
 Old Believers, a comparable phenomenon in the Russian Orthodox Church which dates back to the 17th century
 True Orthodoxy, Old Calendarism and the Catacomb Church – comparable phenomena in the Eastern Orthodox Church which date back to the 1920s
 Continuing Anglican movement, a comparable phenomenon in the Anglican Communion
 Confessing Movement, a similar movement in Mainline Protestant denominations

Other
 Old Catholicism, which started around comparable circumstances surrounding papal infallibility and the First Vatican Council
 Independent Catholicism
 List of traditionalist Catholics by nationality
 Criticism of traditionalist Catholics
 Freedom of religion in Germany § Censorship, for a discussion about a traditionalist Catholic news service which was shut down
 The Remnant – an American newspaper which is dedicated to traditionalist themes

References

Further reading
 
 Peter Jan Margry (2019), 'The Global Network of Deviant Revelatory Marian Movements', in: Chris Maunder (ed.) The Oxford Handbook of Mary (New York: Oxford University Press, p. 662-683; ISBN 978-0-198792550.
 Hull, Geoffrey (2010). The Banished Heart: Origins of Heteropraxis in the Catholic Church, 1995, rpt. T&T Clark/Continuum, London. 
 
 
 
 
 Jungmann, Joseph, (1951) The Mass Of The Roman Rite : Its Origins and Development (Missarum Sollemnia) Volume 1 of 2 Allen, TX: Christian Classics Replica edition 1986

External links
 International Federation Una Voce The main international organisation of Traditionalists considered regular by the Holy See
 The Society of St. Pius X The largest traditionalist body considered irregular by the Holy See
 The Pontifical Commission Ecclesia Dei The Vatican department which deals with relations with traditionalists

Media
 Video of Archbishop Marcel Lefebvre's 1988 consecration of Bernard Tissier de Mallerais, Richard Williamson, Bernard Fellay, and Alfonso de Galarreta as bishops of the Society of St. Pius X
Priests for the 3rd millennium (German)

Traditionalist Catholicism